Nuria Llagostera Vives and María José Martínez Sánchez defeated the two-time defending champions Cara Black and Liezel Huber in the final, 7–6(7–0), 5–7, [10–7] to win the doubles tennis title at the 2009 WTA Tour Championships.

Seeds

Draw

Finals

External links
 Draw

WTA Tour Championships
Doubles